Low is the sixth studio album by American thrash metal band Testament, released on September 30, 1994. It was the band's first album to feature a new lineup, with guitarist James Murphy and drummer John Tempesta replacing Alex Skolnick and Louie Clemente respectively.

This was also Testament's last studio album for 14 years to include bassist Greg Christian, who quit the band in 1996 and rejoined a decade later for two more albums, The Formation of Damnation (2008) and Dark Roots of Earth (2012), before leaving again over financial disputes.

Background
Low would be Testament's last album with Atlantic Records, leading group members to create their own label Burnt Offerings Inc. as part of the change; like its predecessor The Ritual, it was released and distributed only by Atlantic, whereas their first four studio albums were co-released through Megaforce Records. 

Released at a time when the grunge, alternative rock and pop punk genres were all dominating the mainstream, this album marked something of a major departure from the band's earlier works, consisting of elements of groove metal, progressive metal, hard rock, death metal and alternative metal, while it saw Testament staying true to their classic thrash roots. 

Regarding the album's musical direction, guitarist Eric Peterson recalled in a 2013 interview with Spotlight Report:

Low was recorded with primary band members Eric Peterson (rhythm guitar), Greg Christian (bass), and Chuck Billy (vocals). It also saw the first of two Testament album appearances by John Tempesta (drums), and three James Murphy (guitar). Long time Testament collaborator Del James is given composer and vocal credits on the album. Additionally, a music video was filmed for the title track.

Low is dedicated to Savatage guitarist Criss Oliva, who died while Testament was working on the album, and is thanked in the liner notes ("may Criss rest in peace"). Alex Skolnick, who had left Testament two years earlier, briefly replaced Oliva when Savatage was recording their eighth studio album Handful of Rain, which was released a month before Low.

Testament toured for approximately two years to promote Low, playing with bands like Machine Head, Downset., Korn, Forbidden, Kreator, At the Gates, Moonspell, Crowbar, Suffocation and Gorefest. As had happened during the accompanying tour for The Ritual, the band had faced a few lineup changes during the Low era. Tempesta left Testament right after the album was finished to join White Zombie, and was replaced by Jon Dette for most of the album's tour cycle in 1994–1995 before he left to join Slayer. Chris Kontos filled in for Dette for the remaining part of the tour before he, Murphy and Christian each quit in 1996, after which Billy and Peterson briefly put the band on ice and then reformed with a new lineup for their next album Demonic.

Artwork
Album cover artwork for Low was designed by Dave McKean. He would go on to do the next two Testament studio album covers Demonic (1997) and The Gathering (1999).

Reissues
On September 29, 2017, Metal Blade Records released the album on vinyl for the first time in the US along with the previous album The Ritual, limited to 1500 copies.

Reception and legacy

Reviews for Low have generally been mixed. AllMusic's John Franck awards the album four stars out of five, and states, "Testament's sixth studio album literally saw the boys from the Bay Area fighting for their lives in the unfriendly surroundings of the alternative nation. Wisely, the band decided to try something completely different and join forces with Rage Against the Machine/Melvins producer GGGarth Richardson. With temporary drummer John Tempesta in place behind the skins, the band began tracking at A&M studios in Los Angeles. Wanting to return to the no-holds-barred yet musically challenging sounds of works past, the GGGarth teaming proved to be the perfect fodder necessary for Testament to regain their confidence."

Low failed to match the critical or popular acclaim of Testament's previous albums, peaking at #122 on the Billboard 200, the band's second lowest chart position after 1988's The New Order, which debuted at #136. "Low" and "Dog Faced Gods" were released as singles to promote the album, but did not chart. However, "Low" and the cover version of Scorpions' "Sails of Charon" (which appears as a B-side of "Dog Faced Gods") received regular airplay on modern rock stations, the most notable being KNAC.

In July 2014, Guitar World placed Low at number 40 in their "Superunknown: 50 Iconic Albums That Defined 1994" list.

Track listing

Charts

Personnel
Chuck Billy: lead vocals
James Murphy: lead guitar
Eric Peterson: lead and rhythm guitar, backing vocals
Greg Christian: bass
John Tempesta: drums
Dave McKean: album cover artwork
Michael Wagener: mixer
Bill Kennedy: recording engineer

References

Testament (band) albums
1994 albums
Atlantic Records albums
Albums with cover art by Dave McKean
Albums produced by Garth Richardson